In mathematics, the Odlyzko–Schönhage algorithm is a fast algorithm for evaluating the Riemann zeta function at many points, introduced by  .  The main point is the use of the fast Fourier transform to speed up the evaluation of a finite Dirichlet series of length N at O(N) equally spaced values from O(N2) to O(N1+ε) steps (at the cost of storing O(N1+ε) intermediate values). The Riemann–Siegel formula  used for 
calculating the Riemann zeta function  with imaginary part T uses a finite Dirichlet series with about N = T1/2 terms, so when finding about N values of the Riemann zeta function it is sped up by a factor of about T1/2.  This reduces the time to find the zeros of the zeta function with imaginary part at most T from 
about T3/2+ε steps  to about T1+ε steps. 

The algorithm can be used not just for the Riemann zeta function, but also for many other functions given by Dirichlet series. 

References

 This unpublished book describes the implementation of the algorithm and discusses the results in detail.

Analytic number theory
Computational number theory
Zeta and L-functions